Deborah Hutton may refer to:

Deborah Hutton (Australian editor) (born 1961)
Deborah Hutton (English editor) (1955 – 2005)